is the 9th album of Zard and was released on February 15, 2001 under B-Gram Records label.

Background
Album was released for 10th anniversary of ZARD's debut.

The album consist of five previously released singles between years 1999-2000.

Two famous songs were remixed for debut anniversary celebration: Makenaide and Yureru Omoi.

Among of all released original albums, Toki no Tsubasa is only out of print neither available on iTunes. The official statement has never been announced for its discontinuation.

On July 26, 2021, it was announced that all 11 of ZARD's studio albums would be re-released as part of its 30th anniversary campaign on September 15. Ten of them are being released as remastered editions, while the re-issue of Toki no Tsubasa is a re-arranged edition with all ten original songs remixed by Yumeto Tsurusawa. In the streaming platforms, only re-issue version has been added to the catalogues.

Charting performance
The album reached #1 rank first week. It charted 10 weeks and completely sold more than 371,000 copies. This is last studio album which reach rank #1 in Oricon charts.

Track listing
All lyrics written by Izumi Sakai.

In media
Sekai wa Kitto Mirai no Naka: theme song for drama "Maikosan wa Meitantei!"
Itai Kurai Kimi ga Afureteiru yo: commercial song of Nescafé Moment
Kono Namida Hoshi ni Nare: theme song for drama "Kasouken no Onnna"
Get U're Dream: streaming theme song for NHK program "NHK Sydney Olympics"
Promised You: theme song for TV Asahi program "Saturday Night at the Mysteries"

References

Zard albums
2001 albums
Being Inc. albums
Japanese-language albums